Electron is a two-stage, partially recoverable orbital launch vehicle developed by Rocket Lab, an American aerospace company with a wholly owned New Zealand subsidiary. Electron was developed to service the commercial small satellite launch market. Its Rutherford engines are the first electric-pump-fed engine to power an orbital-class rocket. Electron is often flown with a kickstage or Rocket Lab's Photon spacecraft. Although the rocket was designed to be expendable, Rocket Lab has recovered the first stage twice and is working towards the capability of reusing the booster. The Flight 26 (F26) booster has featured the first helicopter catch recovery attempt.

In December 2016, Electron completed flight qualification. The first rocket was launched on 25 May 2017 in a flight called "It's a Test", reaching space but not achieving orbit due to a glitch in communication equipment on the ground. During its second flight on 21 January 2018, Electron reached orbit and deployed three CubeSats, in a mission called "Still Testing". The first commercial launch of Electron, and the third launch overall, occurred on 11 November 2018, in a mission called "It's Business Time".

Design 
Electron uses two stages with the same diameter filled with RP-1/LOX propellant. The main body of the rocket is constructed using a lightweight carbon composite material.

Both stages use the Rutherford rocket engine, the first electric-pump-fed engine to power an orbital rocket. The electric pumps are powered by lithium-polymer batteries. The second stage uses three batteries which are "hot swapped", two of the batteries are jettisoned once depleted to shed mass. There are nine Rutherford engines on the first stage and one vacuum-optimized version on the second stage. The first stage engines deliver  of thrust and the second stage delivers  of thrust. Almost all of the engines' parts are 3D printed to save time and money in the manufacturing process.

Rocket Lab has also developed an optional third stage, known as the "kick stage", designed to circularize the orbits of its satellite payloads. The stage also puts satellites into a more accurate orbit in less time. The Electron kick stage is equipped with a single Curie engine that is capable of performing multiple burns, uses an unspecified "green" bipropellant, and is 3D printed. It was first used during Electron's second flight.

Rocket Lab has also developed a derivative spacecraft of the kick stage, Photon, which is intended for use on lunar and interplanetary missions. Photon will be capable of delivering small payloads of up to  into lunar orbit.

Production 
Manufacturing the carbon composite components of the main flight structure has traditionally required 400 hours, with extensive hand labor in the process. In late 2019, Rocket Lab brought a new robotic manufacturing capability online to produce all composite parts for an Electron in just 12 hours. The robot was nicknamed "Rosie the Robot", after The Jetsons character. The process can make all the carbon fiber structures as well as handle cutting, drilling, and sanding such that the parts are ready for final assembly.  The company objective as of November 2019 is to reduce the overall Electron manufacturing cycle to just seven days.

Rutherford engine production makes extensive use of additive manufacturing and has since the earliest flights of Electron. This allows the capability to scale production in a relatively straightforward manner by increasing the number and capability of 3D printers.

Reusability 
On 6 August 2019, Rocket Lab announced recovery and reflight plans for the first stage of Electron, although plans had started internally from late 2018. Electron was not originally designed to be a reusable launch vehicle as it is a small-lift launch vehicle but was pursued due to increased understanding of Electron's performance based on analysis of previous flights though sensors on the vehicle. In addition, reusability was pursued to meet launch demands. To counteract decreased payload capacity caused by the added mass of recovery hardware, performance improvements to Electrons are expected.

Early phases of recovery included data gathering and surviving atmospheric reentry also known as "The Wall". The next phase will require a successful deployment of an aerodynamic decelerator or ballute to slow the booster followed by the deployment of parafoil concluded by a touchdown in the ocean. After a successful touchdown in the ocean, the stage would be moved onto a ship for refurbishment and reflight. Rocket Lab has not released information on aerodynamic decelerator that would be required to slow down the booster after atmospheric reentry. Late phases of Electron reuse will involve using a parafoil and mid-air retrieval by a helicopter. After a successful mid-air retrieval the helicopter would bring the Electron to a ship that would bring the stage to the launch site for refurbishment and launch.

Aerothermal decelerator 
Rocket Lab, while investigating reusability, decided that they will not pursue propulsive recovery like SpaceX. Instead they will use the atmosphere to slow down the booster in what is known as "aerothermal decelerator" technology. The exact methods used are proprietary but may include keeping proper orientation when reentering the atmosphere and other technologies.

Vehicle modification history 

In pursuit of reusability, Rocket Lab has made changes to Electron. Flight 6 and 7 ("That's a Funny Looking Cactus" and "Make it Rain") had instruments on the first stage needed to gather data to help with the reflight program. Flight 8 ("Look Ma No Hands") had Brutus, an instrument that collected data from the first stage to study reentry and was designed to be able to survive splashdown in the ocean.

Flight 10 ("Running out of Fingers") had a block update to the first stage of the Electron to allow the first guided reentry of the first stage booster. Updates included additional hardware for guidance and navigation; onboard flight computers; and S-Band telemetry to both gather and livestream data gathered during reentry. The first stage also had a reaction control system (RCS) to orient the booster. After stage separation, the first stage using the new hardware installed flipped 180° to prepare for reentry. Throughout the reentry the stage was guided though the atmosphere such that it has the right orientation and angle of attack for the base heat shield to protect the booster from destruction using RCS and onboard computers. Rocket Lab had no plans to recover the stage and instead wanted to demonstrate the ability to successfully reenter. Flight 11 ("Birds of a Feather") demonstrated similar success. No further atmospheric reentry tests similar to flight 10 and 11 are expected.

Following Flight 11 ("Birds of a Feather"), in mid-February 2020, low altitude tests were done to test parachutes. In April 2020, Rocket Lab shared the successful demonstration of mid-air retrieval done in March 2020. An Electron test article was dropped by a helicopter and deployed its parachutes. A helicopter carrying a long-boom snagged a drogue line from the parachute at  demonstrating a successful retrieval. Following the catch the test article was brought back to land.

Flight 16 ("Return to Sender"), was the first to recover the first stage booster, with a splashdown into the Pacific Ocean. The rocket also lofted thirty payloads into Sun-synchronous orbit, including a titanium mass simulator in the shape of the garden gnome "Gnome Chompski" from the video game Half-Life 2.

The payload capacity increase was mainly due to battery advancements. The increased payload capacity allows offset of mass added by recovery technology. In addition, more payload mass could be flown on interplanetary missions and others when Electron is expended.

Fairings
The StriX-α mission for Synspective in December 2020 used an extended fairing.

Autonomous flight termination systems 
Rocket Lab developed their own AFTS for launches from New Zealand from Dec 2019, but for the first launch from US they used the NASA Autonomous Flight Termination Unit.

Applications 
Electron is designed to launch a  payload to a  Sun-synchronous orbit, suitable for CubeSats and other small payloads. In October 2018, Rocket Lab opened a factory large enough to produce more than 50 rockets per year according to the company. Customers may choose to encapsulate their spacecraft in payload fairings provided by the company, which can be easily attached to the rocket shortly before launch. The starting price for delivering payloads to orbit is about US$7.5 million per launch, which offers the only dedicated service at this price point.

Moon Express contracted Rocket Lab to launch lunar landers (multiple launches contracted, some planned for Moon Express operations after GLXP) on an Electron to compete for the Google Lunar X Prize (GLXP). None of the contenders met the prize deadline, and the competition was closed without a winner. For sometime after the closure of GLXP, the Moon Express Electron launches remained scheduled, but before February 2020, all the launches of Moon Express using Electron were canceled.

Launch sites 

The rocket is launched from Rocket Lab Launch Complex 1 on Māhia Peninsula, New Zealand. The launch pad's remote and sparsely populated location is intended to enable a high frequency of launches. The rocket and launch pad were both privately funded, the first time all parts of an orbital launch operation were entirely run by the private sector (other private spaceflight companies lease launch facilities from government agencies or only launch suborbital rockets).

In October 2018, Rocket Lab selected Virginia Space's Mid-Atlantic Regional Spaceport (MARS) at the Wallops Flight Facility, Virginia, as its future secondary launch site in the United States, called Rocket Lab Launch Complex 2. Launch Complex 2 (LC-2) is expected to serve government customers.

The first launch from LC-2 happened on 24 January 2023. An Electron rocket successfully orbited 3 satellites.

Additionally, the UK Space Agency is giving Highlands and Islands Enterprise the opportunity to develop an Electron launch pad on the A' Mhòine Peninsula in Sutherland, Scotland. The location would be named Sutherland spaceport.

Launch history 

The Electron has flown 34 times since May 2017, with a total of 31 successes and 3 failures. The initial test flight, called "It's a Test", failed due to a glitch in communication equipment on the ground, but the follow-up missions, called "Still Testing", "It's Business Time" and "This One's For Pickering", delivered multiple small payloads to low Earth orbit. In August 2019, a mission named "Look Ma, No Hands" successfully delivered four satellites to orbit, and in October 2019, the mission named "As the Crow Flies" successfully launched from Māhia LC-1, deploying a small satellite and its kick stage into a 400 km parking orbit. In July 2020, the thirteenth Electron rocket launch failed with customer payloads on board, the first failure after the maiden flight. In May 2021, the twentieth launch also failed.

Notable launches 
 "Still Testing", Electron's first successful launch
 ELaNa-19 "This One's For Pickering", Electron's first NASA-sponsored launch
 NROL-151, "Birds of a Feather", Electron's first NRO-sponsored launch
 "Return to Sender", Electron's first ocean recovery of the first stage
"It's a little Chile up here", Electron's first launch of the Space Test Program.
 CAPSTONE, Electron's first launch to the Moon.
 HawkEye 360 Cluster 6, "Virginia is for Launch Lovers", Electron's first launch from Launch Complex 2 at the Mid-Atlantic Regional Spaceport.

Launch statistics

See also 

 Small-lift launch vehicle
 Comparison of orbital launcher families
 Comparison of orbital launch systems
 Falcon 1
 Firefly Alpha
 Miura 5
 Vector-R

References

External links 

 Electron website at RocketLabUSA.com
 Electron Payload User's Guide at RocketLabUSA.com
 

Electron
Expendable space launch systems
Microsatellite launch vehicles
Space launch vehicles of New Zealand
Space launch vehicles of the United States
Vehicles introduced in 2017
2017 in spaceflight